The 2023 New Holland Canadian Junior Curling Championships will be held from March 26 to April 2 at the Aréna Glencore in Rouyn-Noranda, Quebec. The winners will represent Canada at the 2023 World Junior-B Curling Championships where they will need to finish in the top three to qualify for the 2024 World Junior Curling Championships in Lohja, Finland.

This will be the third time Rouyn-Noranda will play host the Canadian Junior Curling Championships. The city previously held the men's event in 1960 which was won by Alberta's Tommy Kroeger and the women's event in 1986, won by British Columbia's Jodie Sutton. Like the 2022 championship, the 2023 event will feature eighteen teams on both the men's and women's sides, each split into two pools of nine. The top three teams from each pool at the end of the round robin will advance to the playoff round. Based on results from the 2020 and 2022 events, certain provinces earned two berths to the championship. Alberta, British Columbia, Manitoba, Newfoundland and Labrador, Ontario and Saskatchewan each earned an extra berth on the men's side, while Alberta, Manitoba, New Brunswick and Nova Scotia got two berths on the women's side The host province, Quebec, also earned two teams.

Medallists

Men

Teams
The teams are listed as follows:

Round robin standings

Round robin results
All draw times are listed in Eastern Time (UTC−04:00).

Draw 1
Sunday, March 26, 4:00 pm

Draw 3
Monday, March 27, 9:00 am

Draw 5
Monday, March 27, 7:00 pm

Draw 7
Tuesday, March 28, 2:00 pm

Draw 9
Wednesday, March 29, 9:00 am

Draw 11
Wednesday, March 29, 7:00 pm

Draw 13
Thursday, March 30, 2:00 pm

Draw 15
Friday, March 31, 9:00 am

Draw 17
Friday, March 31, 7:00 pm

Playoffs

Quarterfinals
Saturday, April 1, 1:00 pm

Semifinals
Saturday, April 1, 7:00 pm

Bronze medal game
Sunday, April 2, 11:00 am

Final
Sunday, April 2, 11:00 am

Final standings

Women

Teams
The teams are listed as follows:

Round robin standings

Round robin results
All draw times are listed in Eastern Time (UTC−04:00).

Draw 2
Sunday, March 26, 8:00 pm

Draw 4
Monday, March 27, 2:00 pm

Draw 6
Tuesday, March 28, 9:00 am

Draw 8
Tuesday, March 28, 7:00 pm

Draw 10
Wednesday, March 29, 2:00 pm

Draw 12
Thursday, March 30, 9:00 am

Draw 14
Thursday, March 30, 7:00 pm

Draw 16
Friday, March 31, 2:00 pm

Draw 18
Saturday, April 1, 9:00 am

Playoffs

Quarterfinals
Saturday, April 1, 7:00 pm

Semifinals
Sunday, April 2, 9:00 am

Bronze medal game
Sunday, April 2, 3:00 pm

Final
Sunday, April 2, 3:00 pm

Final standings

Qualification

The Alberta U20 Junior Provincials were held from January 24–29, 2023 at the Spruce Grove Curling Club in Spruce Grove (men's) and the Ellerslie Curling Club in Edmonton (women's).

The championship was held in a round robin format, which qualified three teams for a championship round. Two men's teams and two women's teams qualified for the national championship.

Pre-Playoff Results:

Playoff Results:
Men's Tiebreaker 1: Wipf 4 – Davies 7
Men's Tiebreaker 2: Burton 8 – Runciman 6
Men's Tiebreaker 3: Davies 5 – Burton 4
Men's Semifinal: Tao 10 – Davies 3
Men's Final: Ballance 6 – Tao 4

Women's Semifinal: Johnston 3 – Plett 7
Women's Final: Booth 6 – Plett 8

The BC U21 Junior Championships were held from January 26–29, 2023 at the Duncan Curling Club in Duncan.

The championship was held in a modified triple-knockout format, which qualified three teams for a championship round. Two men's teams qualified for the national championship.

Pre-Playoff Results:

Playoff Results:
Men's Semifinal: Blaeser 3 – Reed 5
Men's Final: Fenton 6 – Reed 3

Women's Semifinal: Hafeli 10 – Wong 1
Women's Final: Bowles 9 – Hafeli 8

The Telus Junior Provincial Championships were held from January 17–21, 2023 at the Portage Curling Club in Portage la Prairie, Manitoba.

The men's championship was held in a round robin format, while the women's event was held in a modified triple-knockout format, which qualified four teams for a page-playoff championship round. Two men's teams and two women's teams qualified for the national championship.

Pre-Playoff Results:

Playoff Results:
Men's A1 vs B1: McDonald 9 – Freeman 1
Men's A2 vs B2: Peterson 9 – Olafson 1
Men's Semifinal: Freeman 7 – Peterson 2
Men's Final: McDonald 8 – Freeman 7

Women's A vs B: Terrick 6 – Beaudry 8
Women's C1 vs C2: Tober 9 – Ehnes 10
Women's Semifinal: Terrick 7 – Ehnes 3
Women's Final: Beaudry 8 – Terrick 9

The Junior U21 Championships were held from January 27–30, 2023 at the Thistle-St. Andrews Curling Club in Saint John.

The championship was held in a modified triple-knockout format, which qualified three teams for a championship round. Two women's teams qualified for the national championship.

Pre-Playoff Results:

Playoff Results:
Men's Semifinal: Marin 7 – Stewart 3
Men's Final: Stewart 4 – Marin 6

Women's Semifinal: Campbell 3 – Forsythe 7
Women's Final: Campbell 8 – Forsythe 3

The U21 Juniors were held from January 18–22, 2023 at the Bally Haly Golf & Curling Club in St. John's.

The men's championship was held in a round robin format, which qualified three teams for a championship round. The women's event was held in a best-of-five series between two rinks. Two men's teams qualified for the national championship.

Pre-Playoff Results:

Playoff Results:
Men's Semifinal: Young 9 – O'Leary 5
Men's Final: Perry 9 – Young 1

The Best Western U21 Junior Provincials were held from March 1–5, 2023 at the Fort William Curling Club in Thunder Bay.

The men's championship was held in a double round robin format, while the women's event was held in a best-of-five series between two rinks.

Pre-Playoff Results:

Playoff Results:
 Men's Tiebreaker: Rajala 3 – Deschene 9
 Men's Final: Burgess 7 – Deschene 3

Men's Team: No men's team declared
Women's Team: Reese Wainman (Inuvik)

The Under 21 Provincial Championship was held from January 11–15, 2023 at the Truro Curling Club in Truro.

The championship was held in a modified triple-knockout format, which qualified three teams for a championship round. Two women's teams qualified for the national championship.

Pre-Playoff Results:

Playoff Results:
Men's Semifinal: MacIsaac 7 – Mosher 6
Men's Final: Mosher 7 – MacIsaac 8

Women's Semifinal: MacNutt 7 – Blades 8
Women's Final: Blades – Blades (N/A)

The Ontario U-21 Curling Championships were held from March 8–12, 2023 at the RA Centre in Ottawa.

The championship was held in a round robin format, which qualified four teams for a championship round. Two men's teams qualified for the national championship.

Pre-Playoff Results:

Playoff Results:
Men's Tiebreaker: Rowe 4 – Gazeley 7
Men's Semifinal 1: Niepage 5 – Rooney 11
Men's Semifinal 2: King 6 – Gazeley 5
Men's Final 1: King 8 – Rooney 5
Men's Qualification Game: Niepage 9 – Gazeley 2
Men's Final 2: Rooney 6 – Niepage 3

Women's Tiebreaker 1: Johnston 2 – Madden 7
Women's Tiebreaker 2: Deschenes 11 – E. Acres 4
Women's Semifinal 1: Zemmelink 12 – Deschenes 3
Women's Semifinal 2: A. Acres 5 – Madden 6
Women's Final: Zemmelink 7 – Madden 6

The PEI Pepsi Junior Curling Championships were held from January 11–15, 2023 at the Crapaud Curling Club in Crapaud.

The championship was held in a modified triple-knockout format, which qualified three teams for a championship round.

Pre-Playoff Results:

Playoff Results:
 No playoff was required as Team Schut and Team Lenentine won all three qualifying events.

The U21 Provincials were held from January 25–29, 2023 at the St-Lambert Curling Club in Saint-Lambert.

The championship was held in a round robin format, which qualified three teams for a championship round. Two men's teams and two women's teams qualified for the national championship.

Pre-Playoff Results:

Playoff Results:
Men's Tiebreaker: Girard 9 – Jauron 4
Men's Final 1: Bédard 6 – Audibert 5
Men's Final 2: Audibert 6 – Girard 7

Women's Final 1: Gionest 9 – Fortin 4
Women's Final 2: Fortin 3 – Cyr 10

The Junior Provincials were held from January 19–22, 2023 at the Swift Current Curling Club in Swift Current.

The men's championship was held in a round robin format, while the women's event was held in a modified triple-knockout format, which qualified four teams for a page-playoff championship round. Two men's teams qualified for the national championship.

Pre-Playoff Results:

Playoff Results:
Men's Tiebreaker: Heistad 6 – Zuravloff 8
Men's 1 vs. 2: Drewitz 5 – Bryden 6
Men's 3 vs. 4: Ede 9 – Zuravloff 1
Men's Semifinal: Drewitz 5 – Ede 6
Men's Final: Bryden 5 – Ede 10

Women's 1 vs. 2: Kessel 5 – Kleiter 7
Women's 3 vs. 4: Kesslering 9 – Pomedli 6
Women's Semifinal: Kessel 6 – Kesslering 3
Women's Final: Kleiter 7 – Kessel 11

Men's Team: No men's team declared
Women's Team: Bayly Scoffin (Whitehorse)

Notelist

References

External links
Official Website

Canadian Junior Curling Championships
Curling in Quebec
Canadian Junior Curling Championships
2023 in Quebec
Sport in Rouyn-Noranda
March 2023 sports events in Canada
April 2023 sports events in Canada